Moderne Zeiten (German for "Modern Times") is the fifth studio album released by the Neue Deutsche Härte band  Unheilig. It was released on January 20, 2006, and, like the band's previous album, Zelluloid, it was released in two versions: a standard 14-track edition, and a limited 16-track edition. The standard edition is in a regular jewel case, with a pinkish-brown album color, while the limited edition is a digipak, with a white album cover.

In July 2009, Moderne Zeiten was re-released with new artwork and a remastered audio track but the cover stayed the same.

Track listing 

2006 albums
Unheilig albums
German-language albums